Möller Ice Stream is an Antarctic ice stream that drains an area of  of the West Antarctic Ice Sheet as it flows north-northeast into the Ronne Ice Shelf to the west of Foundation Ice Stream. The drainage basin of this ice stream is separated by the Rambo Nunataks from the drainage basin of Foundation Ice Stream.

The feature was delineated from U.S. Landsat imagery commissioned by the Institut für Angewandte Geodäsie, Frankfurt am Main, Germany, recorded January–March, 1986. It was named after German engineer Professor Dietrich Möller, Director of the Institute for Land Survey at the Technical University of Braunschweig from 1972, and Deputy Leader and in charge of geodetic work at Filchner Station on the Ronne Ice Shelf in 1979–80.

See also

 List of glaciers in the Antarctic
 List of Antarctic ice streams

References

Ice streams of Queen Elizabeth Land
Filchner-Ronne Ice Shelf